Kannil Theriyum Kathaikal is a 1980 Indian Tamil-language film directed by Devaraj–Mohan and produced by A. L. Raghavan. The film stars Sarath Babu, Sripriya, Vadivukkarasi and M. N. Rajam. The songs for this film were composed by five music directors: K. V. Mahadevan, G. K. Venkatesh, Shankar–Ganesh  (a duo), T. R. Pappa (credited as Agathiyar) and Ilaiyaraaja. The film, released on 14 March 1980, failed commercially.

Plot

Cast 
Sarath Babu
Sripriya
Vadivukkarasi
M. N. Rajam
Senthamarai
Vennira Aadai Moorthy

Production 
Kannil Theriyum Kathaikal was produced by playback singer A. L. Raghavan under Raja Meenakshi Films and was directed by the duo Devaraj–Mohan. Azhagapuri Azhagappan and Amuthavan wrote the dialogue, while T. Krishna was the editor. Film News Anandan worked as the film's public relations officer, and Marcus Bartley Junior was the cinematographer. The filming was held at locations such as Nagarjuna Sagar, Paritala in Andhra Pradesh.

Soundtrack 
The soundtrack consists of five songs. K. V. Mahadevan, G. K. Venkatesh, Shankar–Ganesh (a duo), T. R. Pappa (credited as Agathiyar) and Ilaiyaraaja composed one song each. The song "Naan Oru Ponnoviyam" is set in the Carnatic raga known as Mohanam.

References

External links 
 

1980 films
1980s Tamil-language films
Films directed by Devaraj–Mohan
Films scored by G. K. Venkatesh
Films scored by Ilaiyaraaja
Films scored by K. V. Mahadevan
Films scored by Shankar–Ganesh